Cheiracanthus (from  , 'hand' and  , 'spine') is an extinct genus of a group of fish called Acanthodii (or "spiny sharks"). It was a deep-bodied acanthodian about 12 in. (30 cm) in length. It had a blunt head, upturned tail, and fins protected by spines. Unlike many other acanthodians, it had one, solitary dorsal fin. Cheiracanthus swam at mid-depth in lakes and rivers, seizing small prey in its gaping jaws. Whole fossils of this fish occur only in Mid-Devonian rocks in Scotland, but its distinctive small, ornamented scales crop up around the world, as far south as Antarctica.

See also
 List of acanthodians

References

Acanthodii genera
Devonian fish of Antarctica
Devonian fish of Europe
Taxa named by Louis Agassiz